Sham Singh Attariwala (1790 – 10 February 1846) was a general of the Sikh Empire. He was born in the 1790s in the town of Attari (a few kilometres from the border of Indian and Pakistan Punjab in India), Amritsar, in the Majha region of Panjab, India. As a child he was educated in Gurmukhi and Persian. When Ranjit singh became the Maharaja of Punjab, he got Attariwala's services at his disposal. Maharaja Ranjit Singh knowing his qualities and fighting abilities made him a 'Jathedar' of 5000 horsemen. He participated actively in many campaigns, notably like the campaign of Multan, campaign of Kashmir, campaign of the Frontier Province etc.

Sham Singh Attariwala is also famous for his last stand at the Battle of Sobraon. He joined the Sikh military in 1817 and during the Afghan–Sikh Wars participated in the Battle of Attock, Battle of Multan, Battle of Peshawar, and the 1819 Kashmir expedition.

His daughter Nanaki Kaur Attariwala, later Kunwarani Nanaki Kaur, was married to Prince Nau Nihal Singh and upon his accession to the throne became the Maharani of the Sikh Empire.

He served on the council of regency for Maharajah Dalip Singh.

Gallery

References

Further reading

1846 deaths
Sikh warriors
Year of birth unknown
1790 births